The Gotha WD.7 (for Wasser Doppeldecker - "Water Biplane") was a reconnaissance floatplane developed in the German Empire during World War I.

Development

After the pusher WD.3 was not accepted by the Imperial German Navy, Gotha turned to a new layout that would keep the aircraft's nose free for forward-firing weapons. The WD.7 therefore, was a conventional biplane with twin engines mounted tractor-fashion on the leading edge of the lower wing. Eight examples were built for use as trainers for torpedo bombing. During 1917, two of these aircraft were used for testing a 37 mm (1.46 in) autocannon built by DWM.

The same airframe was used to create the WD.8 reconnaissance floatplane, substituting the twin wing-mounted engines with a single Maybach Mb.IVa in the nose.

Variants
WD.7twin-engine torpedo bomber trainer floatplane, powered by two  Mercedes D.II.
WD.8single-engine reconnaissance floatplane, powered by a  Maybach Mb.IV.

Specifications (WD.7)

References

Further reading

1910s German military trainer aircraft
Floatplanes
WD.07
Biplanes
Twin piston-engined tractor aircraft
Aircraft first flown in 1915